William Edward Collins (18 February 1867 – 22 March 1911) was an Anglican bishop, Bishop of Gibraltar from 1904 until his death.

Biography
William Edward Collins was the second son of Joseph Henry Collins, a mining engineer and writer on geology. He was born in London, but his father moved to Cornwall while he was a child. One of his brothers was Arthur L. Collins, a mining engineer who was murdered in the United States. He was educated at Nuttall's and Chancellor's schools in Truro and at Selwyn College, Cambridge. Ordained in 1891, he began his career as a curate at All Hallows-by-the-Tower in the City of London. After a short spell as a Lecturer at his old college he became Professor of Ecclesiastical History at King's College London where he remained until his elevation to the episcopate. As Bishop of Gibraltar he worked from The Convent, which was the residence of the Governor of Gibraltar, although he had his own house in Malta. He was consecrated a bishop on the Feast of the Conversion of St Paul 1904 (25 January), at Westminster Abbey by Randall Davidson, Archbishop of Canterbury. A Sub-Prelate of the Order of St John of Jerusalem, he died on 22 March 1911 in Constantinople.  He is interred at the St. John the Evangelist's Anglican Church, Izmir in Turkey.

Collins' life was described in a biography by Arthur James Mason.

Notes

External links

1867 births
1911 deaths
Alumni of Selwyn College, Cambridge
Academics of King's College London
20th-century Anglican bishops of Gibraltar
Sub-Prelates of the Venerable Order of Saint John